Psyra spurcataria is a species of moth of the family  Geometridae first described by Francis Walker in 1863. It is found in Asia, including Taiwan, India and Bhutan.

The wingspan is 45–53 mm.

References

Moths described in 1863
Ennominae